Alexander Ross Winter (born July 17, 1965) is a British-American actor and filmmaker. He played the slacker Bill in the 1989 film Bill & Ted's Excellent Adventure and its sequels Bill & Ted's Bogus Journey (1991) and Bill & Ted Face the Music (2020). He is also known for his role as Marko in the 1987 vampire film The Lost Boys; for co-writing, co-directing, and starring in the 1993 film Freaked; and for directing documentaries in the 2010s.

Early life
Winter was born in London, England. His mother, Margaret "Gregg" Mayer, is a New York-born former Martha Graham dancer, who founded a modern-dance company in London in the mid-1960s. His father, Ross Albert Winter, is an Australian who danced with Winter's mother's troupe. 

Winter received training in dance as a child. He has an older brother named Stephen. His father has English ancestry and his mother is Jewish, of Ukrainian Jewish descent.

When Winter was five, his family moved to Missouri, where his father ran the Mid-American Dance Company, while his mother taught dance at Washington University in St. Louis. The two divorced in 1973.

In 1978, Winter moved to the New York City area, where he and his mother lived in Montclair, New Jersey. During this time Winter began performing as an actor on and off Broadway, commuting into New York City. He reports his experience in New Jersey as being positive.

In 1983, after graduating from Montclair High School, Winter was accepted into the Tisch School of the Arts at New York University. While at NYU, he met fellow aspiring filmmaker Tom Stern. The two collaborated on a number of 16 mm short films and both graduated with honours.

Career

As an actor, Winter spent many years on Broadway with supporting roles in productions of The King and I, Peter Pan, or The Boy Who Wouldn't Grow Up, and the American premiere of Simon Gray's Close of Play at the Manhattan Theatre Club.

Winter dropped out of NYU film school before his senior year, and he and Tom Stern moved out to Hollywood, where the two wrote and directed a number of short films and music videos. Winter continued to find work as an actor, landing notable roles in such big productions as The Lost Boys and Rosalie Goes Shopping.

In 1989, Winter found international success when he co-starred with Keanu Reeves, playing Bill S. Preston in the smash-hit comedy Bill & Ted's Excellent Adventure, a role he reprised in its 1991 sequel, Bill & Ted's Bogus Journey.

Following the success of Bill & Ted, Winter and creative collaborators Tom Stern and Tim Burns were hired to develop a sketch comedy show for MTV. The result, 1991's The Idiot Box, was a success for the network, but the channel's budgetary problems prevented them from filming additional seasons, and it was canceled after six episodes. Winter, Stern and Burns accepted a $12 million deal from 20th Century Fox to film their own feature film, which became 1993's Freaked. While the film was never widely released, despite positive reviews from The New York Times and Entertainment Weekly, Freaked went on to become a cult favourite, through festivals, TV and DVD, and was cited by Entertainment Weekly, on their list of Top Ten Comedies of the Nineties.

Winter did not return to directing until 1999, when he filmed Fever. The film was shown at film festivals worldwide, including Official Selection in the Director's Fortnight at Cannes. New York Daily News praised the film, calling it "a claustrophobic mind bender. Winter sustains an aura of creepiness worthy of Roman Polanski."

Winter directed the live-action adaptation of the hit Cartoon Network series Ben 10, which aired in November 2007 and garnered the highest ratings in Cartoon Network history. He directed its sequel, Ben 10: Alien Swarm, which aired on Cartoon Network in November 2009 and captured over 16 million viewers in its premiere weekend.  As of 2008, he was attached to write the screenplay for the Howard Stern-produced remake of Rock 'n' Roll High School. In 2010, he was attached to direct a 3D-remake of the 1987 horror film The Gate, which was scheduled for release in 2011.

Winter's 2012 VH1 rock doc Downloaded earned worldwide critical acclaim at theatrical and festival screenings. Winter's multiple award-winning 2015 documentary Deep Web had its world premiere at SXSW and a broadcast premiere in the U.S. on the Epix network alongside a global festival tour. The film went wide on September, 2015, opening as the #1 documentary on iTunes.

In 2013, he had a role in the thriller Grand Piano, starring Elijah Wood and John Cusack, playing The Assistant.

In 2016, Winter released a short documentary entitled Relatively Free about journalist Barrett Brown's release from prison. This was followed in 2017 by another short documentary, Trump's Lobby about President elect Donald Trump.

In 2018, Winter released two documentaries, The Panama Papers, about the Panama Papers, and Trust Machine: The Story Of Blockchain, which premiered in Los Angeles on November 16, 2018. In July 2015, Winter began work on a biographical documentary of the rock guitarist and composer Frank Zappa. The Zappa Family Trust publicly gave its approval to Winter's plans for the film. Released on November 27, 2020, Zappa was not only the first documentary with access to his archives, but this project was the highest funded documentary in crowdfunding history, via Kickstarter.

In April 2011, Winter's Bill & Ted co-star Keanu Reeves confirmed that a third installment of the film series was under way; the film was in development for most of the 2010s. Winter returned as Bill S. Preston, Esq. in the film, Bill & Ted Face the Music, which was released on August 28, 2020; with Reeves describing the plot as, "Basically, they're supposed to write a song to save the world and they haven't done that."

Technology and privacy activism
Winter began devoting a lot of his attention to the internet not just because he liked technology, but also because "I found this community there." Winter liked the idea of large numbers of anonymous users discussing a variety of topics in an anonymous space. "I found that really striking then. And it seemed liked the beginning of something." He has criticized media companies and news outlets for exaggerating how many people used Napster for digital piracy. "Napster was a huge threat to the power structure," Winter said.

Winter's interest in technology, the Internet and privacy inspired him to make the 2012 documentary film Downloaded, about internet file sharing and Napster, and the 2015 film Deep Web, about the Silk Road, bitcoin, and the dark web.

Personal life
Winter was married to Sonya Dawson, with whom he had a son, born in 1998. The couple later divorced. In 2010, he married Ramsey Ann Naito. They have two children.

Winter maintains dual British and American citizenship.

On February 2, 2018, Winter revealed that he was molested by an older man at age 13 while he was acting on Broadway. Winter refused to name his abuser, but revealed he is coping with PTSD since the incident, saying “I had extreme PTSD for many, many years, and that will wreak havoc on you."

Filmography

Film 
Directing

Acting

Television 
Directing

Acting

Music videos

Theatre

References

External links 

 
 
 
 

1965 births
20th-century English male actors
21st-century English male actors
20th-century English screenwriters
21st-century British screenwriters
American documentary film directors
American male comedy actors
American male film actors
People with post-traumatic stress disorder
American male television actors
American male voice actors
American music video directors
American people of Australian descent
American people of English descent
American people of Ukrainian-Jewish descent
American television directors
American television writers
British male comedy actors
British documentary filmmakers
English emigrants to the United States
English film directors
English male film actors
English male television actors
English male voice actors
English music video directors
English people of American descent
English people of Australian descent
English television directors
English television writers
Film directors from New Jersey
American film producers
Jewish American male actors
Jewish American writers
Jewish English male actors
Living people
Male actors from London
American male television writers
Montclair High School (New Jersey) alumni
People from Montclair, New Jersey
Tisch School of the Arts alumni
English film producers
Film directors from London
Film producers from London
Writers from London